Ulmi is a commune located in Giurgiu County, Muntenia, Romania. It is composed of eight villages: Căscioarele, Drăgăneasca, Ghionea, Icoana, Moșteni, Poenari, Trestieni and Ulmi.

References

External links 

Communes in Giurgiu County
Localities in Muntenia